{{DISPLAYTITLE:Nu2 Columbae}}

Nu2 Columbae  is a solitary star in the southern constellation of Columba. It can be seen with the naked eye, having an apparent visual magnitude of 5.31.

This star has a stellar classification of F5 V, indicating that it is an F-type main sequence star that is generating energy through the thermonuclear fusion of hydrogen into helium in its core region. It has about 1.65 times the mass of the Sun and 1.6 times the Sun's radius.

References

F-type main-sequence stars
Columba (constellation)
Columbae, Nu2
Durchmusterung objects
037495
026460
01935